Paul Iby (born on January 23, 1935, Doborján) is Bishop Emeritus of the Roman Catholic Diocese of Eisenstadt, Austria.

Views

Clerical celibacy 
Bishop Iby is convinced the Catholic church should drop its celibacy requirement for priests. It should be up to priests to decide whether they want to live a celibate life. "It should be at the discretion of every priest whether to live in voluntary celibacy or in a family," Die Presse quoted Iby as saying.

He would also welcome it if married men could be ordained.

Ordination of women 
Bishop Iby also said that eventually the ordination of women should be considered.

References 

1935 births
Living people
20th-century Austrian people
21st-century Austrian people
Roman Catholic bishops of Eisenstadt
Dissident Roman Catholic theologians
Austrian people of Hungarian descent
People from Oberpullendorf District